The Weather Station is a Canadian folk music band fronted by Tamara Lindeman, formed in 2006. The band membership has changed over the years, and as of 2022 includes Lindeman (lead vocals, piano), Ben Whiteley (bass), Johnny Spence (keyboards), Will Kidman (guitar), Christine Bougie (guitar), Karen Ng (saxophone, clarinet), Evan Cartwright (drums), and Kieran Adams (drums).

History
The band's debut album The Line was released in 2009. Their second album, All of It Was Mine, made in collaboration with Daniel Romano, was released in 2011.

Lindeman was a nominee for the 2013 SOCAN Songwriting Prize for The Weather Station's song "Mule in the Flowers", co-written with Steve Lambke.

The band's third album, Loyalty, was recorded at La Frette studios near Paris, France, with Afie Jurvanen and Robbie Lackritz, who have worked on albums with Bahamas, Feist, Zeus, and Jason Collett. Loyalty was released on May 5, 2015, on Paradise of Bachelors (U.S. and worldwide) and Outside Music (Canada).

The self-titled 4th studio album was released in October 2017, on the Paradise of Bachelors (U.S. and worldwide) and Outside Music (Canada). The 11 tracks are purest indie folk. On 18 October 2018,  Live At Union was released independently as a limited edition available on Bandcamp.

The band's fifth album Ignorance was released worldwide on Fat Possum Records on 5 February 2021 and a small part (digital or vinyl only) on Next Door Records in Canada. The ten tracks were recorded with two percussionists, a saxophonist and a flutist, plus bass, keys, and guitar. Songwriter Tamara Lindeman wrote and produced all the songs. The album's theme is based on Lindeman's contemplation of the global climate crisis. Lindeman explained album's title in an NPR interview as "about this process of moving through denial into understanding". It was shortlisted for the 2021 Polaris Music Prize.

On March 4, 2022, the band released their sixth album, How Is It That I Should Look at the Stars, also through Fat Possum. The album consists of ten songs written simultaneously with those on Ignorance but deemed too dissimilar to be included on that album; Lindeman called the album "the moon to Ignorances sun". The album was recorded in March 2020 in Toronto.

Discography

Albums

Extended plays 
East EP (2008)
 Duets #1–3 (2013)
 What Am I Going to Do with Everything I Know EP (2014)

Singles 
 "Floodplain" (2015)
 "Thirty" (2017)
 "Kept It All to Myself" (2017)
 "You and I (On the Other Side of the World)" (2017)
 "Impossible" (2017)
 "Robber" (2020)
 "Tried to Tell You" (2020)
 "Atlantic" (2021)
 "Parking Lot" (2021)
 "Endless Time" (2022)
 "To Talk About" (2022)

References

External links 
 

Canadian folk rock groups
Musical groups from Toronto
Musical groups established in 2006
Canadian indie folk groups
Fat Possum Records artists